François Briatte (27 September 1805 – 30 January 1877) was a Swiss politician, member of the Conseil d'Etat of the Canton of Vaud (1845–1861), member and several times President of the Swiss Council of States.

External links

1805 births
1877 deaths
People from Lausanne
Swiss Calvinist and Reformed Christians
Members of the Council of States (Switzerland)
Presidents of the Council of States (Switzerland)
19th-century Swiss politicians